Church of Righteous John the Russian in Kuntsevo is an orthodox church in Moscow, Russia, in Kuntsevo district of Western Administrative Okrug.

The church belongs to the Deanery (Blagochiniye) of St. George, Western Vicariate, Urban Diocese of Moscow of Russian Orthodox Church.

Church complex 
By the blessing of Patriarch Alexy II of Moscow and all Rus' a small wooden church was erected in 2004, its architectural form being "korablets" (Old Russian: кораблец, "a small ship"), which is characteristic for old Russian wooden churches and represents the Church as a sanctuary from the storms of life.

In 2010 the Mayor of Moscow signed an order to build a church complex, thus a tract of land to build a large stone church was assigned. The church became a part of the Program of Building of Orthodox Churches in Moscow ("200 Churches").

7 July 2016 the head of the Western Vicariate of Moscow Bishop Tikhon of Yegoryevsk consecrated the erected church by the brief rite.

2 April 2017 Patriarch Kirill of Moscow and all Rus' consecrated the church by the great rite.

The main altar of the church is consecrated in honour of Saint Righteous John the Russian, the Confessor of Faith. Also there is a side-altar which is consecrated in honour of the Annunciation.

The church keeps an icon of Righteous John the Russian with a piece of his relics. The small wooden church is decorated with a wrought melchior iconostasis in basma technique, which blends Old Russian traditions with some elements of Byzantine style, and murals.

Divine services and parish activities 
The divine services are held daily – a Liturgy at 8:30 am (two Liturgies, at 7 am and at 10 am on Sundays, The Twelve Great Feasts and other great feasts), and an evening service at 5 pm. All the kinds of occasional services are also administered: Molebens, Memorial services, Matrimonies and Baptisms.

The parish activities include a Sunday school for different ages with an amateur theatre, handwork clubs, the Parus (Russian: "a sail") club of history and tourism for teenagers, the Vernost (Russian: "fidelity") union of Orthodox young adults, a pilgrimage service, a social service, a school of Orthodox home economics, a video lecture-hall.

The priesthood and the social service of the church help the 15th Orphanage for children with growth abnormalities, local state centers of social service, parishioners in need and prisoners.

On 8 May 2015, the day before 60th anniversary of the Victory in the Great Patriotic War, upon an initiative of parishioners a monument of The Defender of Motherland was erected beside the church. The monument depicts a tired soldier in Second World War Soviet army uniform, holding a PPSh-41 with its barrel pointing downwards, seemingly returning home after the victory in World War II.

Patronal feasts 
 Day of Saint Righteous John the Russian, the Confessor of Faith –  27 May (JC) / 9 June (GC).
 Annunciation – 25 March (JC) / 7 April (GC).

Priesthood of the Church 
 senior priest protoiereus Andrey Smirnov
protoiereus Mikhail Glazov
 priest Dimitry Mazanov
 priest Boris Ivanov
priest Arseniy Ivanchenko
deacon Ilya Yurin

See also

 Saint John the Russian
 Kuntsevo district of Moscow
List of churches in Moscow

References

External links
Official website 

Russian Orthodox churches in Moscow
Eastern Orthodox church buildings in Russia
Church buildings with domes 
21st-century Eastern Orthodox church buildings
21st-century churches in Russia